Rolen Calixto Paulino Sr. (born November 24, 1962) is a Filipino politician. He was the Mayor of Olongapo City in Zambales and father of incumbent Mayor Rolen C. Paulino Jr.

Career

2007 mayoral election
He ran for mayor of Olongapo, but he was defeated by James "Bong" Gordon Jr.

2010 vice mayoral election
He ran for vice mayor of Olongapo and won after garnering 47,074 against Gordon's running mate, Cynthia Cajudo, who garnered 31,121. He was sworn on June 30, 2010.

2013 mayoral election

He ran for mayor of Olongapo. His opponents are Anne Gordon, wife of the incumbent mayor James "Bong" Gordon, Jr. who is term-limited, and Bugsy delos Reyes, Gordon's nephew. He won the election that ended the Gordon political dynasty.

2016 mayoral election

He ran for re-election mayor of Olongapo. His opponents are James "Bong" Gordon, Jr. and independent candidate Octavio Galvezo. He overwhelmingly won the election.

Mayor of Olongapo (2013-2019)
On June 28, 2013, he was inaugurated at Rizal Triangle in Olongapo. On June 30, his term officially started. On July 2, he and his team met Department of Energy Secretary Jericho Petilla and PSALM (Private Sector Asset Liabilities Management) President Emmanuel Ledesma Jr. regarding the PhP 5.08 billion power debt. They agreed to cancel the power disconnection, and PSALM would restructure the payment scheme. Therefore, Paulino averted his city's power disconnection.

In September 2018, he was suspended, together with other officials, by the ombudsman for allegedly entering into disadvantageous lease contracts of the Olongapo City Civic Center in 2014 to 2015. He was replaced by councilor Lugie Lipumano Garcia as OIC Mayor.

In April 2019, the Sandiganbayan ordered his arrest, along with vice-mayor Aquilino Cortez Jr. and city councilors, in connection with the violations. In July 2019, the charges were dismissed because Paulino and co-accused were able to prove that the Build-Operate-Transfer (BOT) law does not apply to the lease agreements. The Sandiganbayan Seventh Division has affirmed its decision to free him and co-accused of graft charges.

Chairman and Administrator of Subic Bay Metropolitan Authority (March 2022)
On March 1, 2022 after his political stint as City Mayor of Olongapo, He was appointed by President Rodrigo Duterte as Subic Bay Metropolitan Authority as Chairman & Administrator as replacement to the resignation of concurrent SBMA Chairman & Administrator Atty. Wilma T. Eisma. Eisma was appointed as Board of Director to the Development Bank of the Philippines which is a Government-owned and controlled corporation. the Oath taking of Chairman Paulino was presided by Salvador Medialdea, Executive Secretary of the Philippines.

References

1962 births
Living people
Mayors of Olongapo
Nationalist People's Coalition politicians
People from Olongapo